The Formalist: A Journal of Metrical Poetry was a literary periodical, founded and edited by William Baer, which was published twice a year from 1990 to the fall/winter issue of 2004. The headquarters of the magazine was in Evansville, Indiana.

The Formalist published contemporary, metrical verse.  Poets whose work has appeared in the journal include: Howard Nemerov, Richard Wilbur, Derek Walcott, Mona Van Duyn, Donald Justice, James Merrill, Maxine Kumin, Karl Shapiro, W. S. Merwin, May Swenson, W. D. Snodgrass, Louis Simpson, John Updike, Fred Chappell, and John Hollander.

From 1994 to 2005 The Formalist awarded the Howard Nemerov Sonnet Award.

See also

New Formalism
Measure

References

External links
 

Defunct literary magazines published in the United States
Magazines established in 1990
Magazines disestablished in 2004
Biannual magazines published in the United States
Poetry magazines published in the United States
Magazines published in Indiana
Mass media in Evansville, Indiana